The Cambodia men's national volleyball team represents Cambodia in international men's volleyball competitions and friendly matches.

It won 3rd place at the Volleyball at the 2021 Southeast Asian Games event in Vietnam.

Current squad
The following is the roster in the 2021 Southeast Asian Games.

Head coach: Li Jun
Assistance coach/Translator: Seng Nguon

Results

Asian Games

 Champions   Runners up   Third place   Fourth place

Southeast Asian Games

 Champions   Runners up   Third place   Fourth place

References

External links

FIVB profile

National sports teams of Cambodia
National men's volleyball teams
Volleyball in Cambodia
Men's sport in Cambodia